The John Paul II Bridge (New Pulawy bridge) is an arch bridge over the Vistula River in Puławy, Poland.

The  deck is hung from the arches with 112 steel rods.

The bridge is named after Pope John Paul II and was completed on 11 July 2008.

The  European Regional Development Fund had contributed towards the financing of the bridge construction.

References

External links

 John Paul II Bridge in Polish Bridges database (in Polish)

Road bridges in Poland
Through arch bridges
Bridges completed in 2008
Bridges in Puławy (city)
2008 establishments in Poland